Simone Rocha (born 1986) is an Irish fashion designer. She is the daughter of fashion designer John Rocha, and trained at the National College of Art and Design, Dublin and at Central Saint Martins, London. She launched her graduate collection in 2010 at the Tate Modern and in London Fashion Week. She was named Young Designer of the Year in 2014 by Harper's Bazaar, and Womenswear Designer of the Year 2016 at the British Fashion Awards.

Career
Rocha was born in Dublin, Ireland in 1986; her father is fashion designer John Rocha. She later felt that it was "inevitable" that she would follow in his career, adding that fashion was "100% part of [her] life". Rocha worked at her father's studio between the ages of 13 and 18. She trained at the National College of Art and Design in Dublin, Ireland, and under Louise Wilson at Central Saint Martins in London.

Rocha showed her graduate collection at the Tate Modern gallery, and in London Fashion Week for the first time in 2010. Her first fashion installation was in the window of Dover Street Market in London, with the company the first to stock Rocha's designs. She had an outlet within their store when it was located on Dover Street, and continues to have one within their new store in Haymarket. In the early days, her lines were also stocked by Paris-based boutique Colette. More recently, Rocha has opened independent stores of her own in both London and New York. In her native Ireland, her only stockist is Havana in Dublin.

Harper's Bazaar named Rocha their Young Designer of the Year in 2014, and in 2016 she was named Womenswear Designer of the Year at the British Fashion Awards. Rocha's work has previously been worn by the Princess of Wales and Michelle Obama.

In 2018, she collaborated with the Italian brand Moncler as part of their Genius Collection series.

In March 2021, Rocha had a collaboration line drop with Swedish Fast fashion company H&M.

Personal life
She is married to cinematographer Eoin McLoughlin, and they have a daughter together. They live in De Beauvoir Town, London, where her design studio is also based.

References

External links

Living people
1986 births
Irish fashion designers
Irish women fashion designers
People from Ranelagh